Ra'yn is a sub-district located in Yarim District, Ibb Governorate, Yemen. Ra'yn had a population of 18,242 as of 2004.

References 

Sub-districts in Yarim District